Haemateulia haematitis is a species of moth of the family Tortricidae. It is found in Chile (Llanquihue Province, Malleco Province, Ñuble Region, Osorno Province) and Argentina (Chubut Province, Neuquén Province, Río Negro Province).

References

Moths described in 1931
Euliini